William Cumming (July 30, 1724–1797) was an American lawyer who served as a delegate to the Continental Congress for North Carolina in 1785.

William was born in Annapolis, Maryland on July 30, 1724. He read law and practiced in Maryland for several years before he moved to Edenton, North Carolina. In North Carolina his law practice extended into several counties: Chowan, Currituck, and Pasquotank Counties.

Cumming attended the colony's Provincial Congress in 1776 and was first elected to North Carolina's House of Commons in 1781, and served in several other terms as well. In 1784 and 1785 the legislature named him as a delegate to the Continental Congress, but he only attended sessions of the Congress in 1785.

References

 Samuel A. Ashe, "William Cumming" (Manuscript Department, Library, Duke University, Durham).

External links

1724 births
1797 deaths
People from Edenton, North Carolina
Continental Congressmen from North Carolina
18th-century American politicians
American lawyers admitted to the practice of law by reading law
People from Annapolis, Maryland
Members of the North Carolina Provincial Congresses